The East Texas Musical Convention, now usually called the East Texas Sacred Harp Convention, is an annual gathering of shape note singers. Songs are sung a cappella from the Sacred Harp tunebook. The Convention was organized in 1855, and is the oldest Sacred Harp convention in Texas, and the second oldest in the United States. The East Texas Convention was modeled after the older (now defunct) Southern Musical Convention established in 1845 by Benjamin Franklin White, the compiler of The Sacred Harp.

The East Texas Convention has a continuous history from 1868, the earliest year notated in its minutes. William Russell Adams, President of the Convention in 1874, 1884, and 1885, wrote to Aldine S. Kieffer, explaining that the convention missed a few years of meeting because of the American Civil War. Re-established after the war, a large influx of Georgia and Alabama settlers added to its strength. In its early years it was generally considered a forum of Christian worship. Today many are attracted to its folk music aspect.

Throughout its history, the East Texas Musical Convention has convened annually in six East Texas counties: Gregg, Harrison, Panola, Rusk, Smith and Upshur. The Convention presently meets for two days in Henderson, Texas on the weekend of the second Sunday in August. The current "textbook" of the Convention is The Sacred Harp (2012 Revised Cooper Edition), first revised by W. M. Cooper and others in 1902.

Early officers

John T. Holloway
James Pendleton Holloway
Mathew Mark Wynn
Thomas Jefferson Allison
Charles Absalem Mangham
John Franklin McLendon

References

Approaching 150: A Brief History of the East Texas Musical Convention, by R. L. Vaughn 
The Chattahoochee Musical Convention: 1852-2002, Kiri Miller, editor 
The Musical Million and Fireside Friend, periodical, Dayton, VA; Aldine S. Kieffer, editor; Volume XI (1880), page 135
The Sacred Harp: A Tradition and Its Music, by Buell E. Cobb 
White Spirituals in the Southern Uplands, by George Pullen Jackson

External links
East Texas Convention - 2004 online minutes
East Texas Convention Constitution
Texas Sacred Harp Historical page

Sacred Harp
Shape note
Organizations based in Texas
Texas culture
Recurring events established in 1855
1855 establishments in Texas
Music festivals established in 1855